A kitchenette is a small cooking area, which usually has a refrigerator and a microwave, but may have other appliances. In some motel and hotel rooms, small apartments, college dormitories, or office buildings, a kitchenette consists of a small refrigerator, a microwave oven, and sometimes a sink. New York City building code defines a kitchenette as a kitchen of less than 7.4 m2 (80 ft2) of floor space.

In hotels and motels
Kitchenettes are a common feature in hotel and motel guest rooms and often contain a coffeemaker, a bar refrigerator, commonly called a mini-bar. Some hotel kitchenettes have provisioned refrigerators that have an interior sensor feature used by management to monitor guest use of the refrigerator's contents and thus charge for the consumables, which typically include soda, beer, and liquor.

In Britain
In British English, the term kitchenette also refers to a small secondary kitchen in a house. Often it is found on the same floor as the children's bedrooms, and used by a nanny or au pair to prepare meals for children; the same feature can be found in hotels such as some in London.

Small apartment style
The word kitchenette was also used to refer to a type of small apartment prevalent in African American communities in Chicago and New York City during the mid-twentieth century. Landlords often divided single-family homes or large apartment units into smaller units to house more families. Living conditions in these kitchenettes were often wretched; the author Richard Wright described them as "our prison, our death sentence without a trial".

In Brazil, a kitchenette (spelled "quitinete"  in Brazilian Portuguese) is a very small apartment. It is composed of one room, one bathroom, and a kitchen, which is often in the same space as the room. It corresponds to the studio apartment in American culture (or a bedsit in the UK and Ireland).

References

External links 

 Kitchenettes entry at the Encyclopedia of Chicago

Kitchen
Apartments